Johns Hopkins Children's Center (JHCC) is a nationally ranked, pediatric acute care children's teaching hospital located in Baltimore, Maryland, adjacent to Johns Hopkins Hospital. The hospital has 196 pediatric beds and is affiliated the Johns Hopkins School of Medicine. The hospital is the flagship pediatric member of Johns Hopkins Medicine and is 1 of 2 children's hospital in the network. The hospital provides comprehensive pediatric specialties and subspecialties to infants, children, teens, and young adults aged 0–21 throughout Baltimore and the wider United States. Johns Hopkins Children's Center also sometimes treats adults that require pediatric care. Johns Hopkins Children's Center also features the only ACS verified Level 1 Pediatric Trauma Center in the state. The hospital is directly attached to Johns Hopkins Hospital and is situated near the Ronald McDonald House of Maryland.

History 
Pediatrics at Johns Hopkins originated in 1912 when the original Harriet Lane Home for Invalid Children opened. The new hospital was set to be named after Baltimore resident, Harriet Lane Johnston after she donated $400,000 in 1903 to establish the home as a memorial to her two sons who had died in childhood. After a few years of building, the building opened in October 1912. Harriet Lane Home for Invalid Children was first children's clinic in the United States that was associated with a medical school.

At the time, most children were seen in the same facilities as adults and pediatrics was just a subspecialty of general medicine. The new care model that Johns Hopkins pioneered became the industry standard for pediatrics in the United States. Eventually treating over 60,000 children a year, the Harriet Lane Home became a pioneer treatment, teaching, and research clinic, and the first to have subspecialties in pediatrics as created by Edwards A. Park.

From 1930 to 1963 Helen Taussig, who helped to develop the blue baby operation, headed the pediatric cardiac clinic. Child psychiatrist Leo Kanner did studies of autistic children. Lawson Wilkins established an endocrine clinic that developed procedures used universally to treat children with certain glandular disorders, including dwarfism. John E. Bordley and William G. Hardy made strides in detecting hearing impairments in very young children.

In 1964, the Children's Medical & Surgical Center (CMSC) opened on the Johns Hopkins campus to better provide patient care to their pediatric patients. The addition meant that for the first time, parents were able to sleep in the same room as their children, a rare occurrence for children's hospitals at the time. After the new Charlotte R. Bloomberg Children's Center opened in 2012, the CMSC was decommissioned and turned into a laboratory space and space to simulate a hospital environment for trainees. Plans have also been made to construct a new facade and renovate the CMSC to house more research programs.

In May 2012, the Johns Hopkins Hospital opened two new towers as part of a major campus redevelopment effort. The opening of the new $1.1 billion Charlotte R. Bloomberg Children's Center tower and the new adult Sheikh Zayed Tower marked the high point of this effort. The tower provides 560,000 square feet and many new modern amenities. The new towers featured colorful exteriors designed by artist Spencer Finch, and general design from the design firm, Perkins and Will.

Charlotte R. Bloomberg Children's Center got its name when former New York Mayor Michael Bloomberg donated $120 million to the construction of the new children's tower.

About 
The hospital has an American Academy of Pediatrics verified level IV neonatal intensive care unit that has a capacity of 45 bassinets. The hospital also has a 40-bed pediatric intensive care unit for critical pediatric patients age 0-21. The hospital also features 10 operating rooms.

Awards 
Johns Hopkins Children's Center is regularly regarded as a national leader in pediatrics.

Through their affiliation with Johns Hopkins Hospital, JHCC has been recognized by the American Nursing Association as a Magnet hospital for the years 2003, 2008, 2013, 2018.

Parents Magazine has ranked the hospital as one if the best 20 best children's hospitals in the country in their top 20 pediatric technology and innovations rankings.

As of 2021 Johns Hopkins Children's Center has placed nationally in all 10 ranked pediatric specialties on U.S. News & World Report: Best Children's Hospital rankings.

Patient care units 
The hospital offers a few different units for infants, children, teens, and young adults age 0-21 based on age or diagnosis.

 20-bed Pediatric Medical and Surgical Oncology
 40-bed Pediatric Intensive Care Unit
 45-bed Level IV Neonatal Intensive Care Unit
 35-bed Pediatric Emergency Department
 62-bed General Pediatric Units (based on age)

Firsts 
The first ever successful separation of conjoined twins occurred at the hospital on September 7, 1987. The twins, Patrick and Benjamin Binder were the first twins to be successfully separated in the world. The separation was led by neurosurgeon Ben Carson, of Baltimore, Maryland.  For this operation Carson was able to prepare by studying a three-dimensional physical model of the twins' anatomy.  Carson described this separation as the first of its kind, with 23 similar attempted separations ending in the death of one or both twins.

Notable staff 

 Ben Carson - Former chief of pediatric neurosurgery, former Secretary of H.U.D. former presidential candidate
 Leo Kanner - Founder of the specialty, Child and Adolescent psychiatry
 Helen B. Taussig - Pioneer of the pediatric cardiology specialty
Catherine Neill
 Lawson Wilkins
 Edwards A. Park
 Vivien Thomas

See also 

 List of Children's Hospitals in the United States 
 Johns Hopkins School of Medicine
 Johns Hopkins Hospital
 Ben Carson
 Johns Hopkins All Children's Hospital
 Center for Talented Youth

References

External links 

 Hopkins Children's Center website

Children's hospitals in the United States
Hospital buildings completed in 2012
Johns Hopkins Medical Institutions
Hospitals in Maryland
Teaching hospitals in Maryland
Hospital buildings completed in 1964
Pediatric trauma centers